

Flora

Plants

Fungi

Cnidarians

Research
 Yunnanoascus haikouensis, previously thought to be a member of Ctenophora, is reinterpreted as a crown-group medusozoan by Han et al. (2016).
 A study on the fossil corals from the Late Triassic (Norian) outcrops in Antalya Province (Turkey), indicating that the corals lived in symbiosis with photosynthesizing dinoflagellate algae, is published by Frankowiak et al. (2016).

New taxa

Arthropods

Bryozoans

Brachiopods
{| class="wikitable sortable" align="center" width="100%"
|-
! Name
! Novelty
! Status
! Authors
! Age
! Unit
! Location
! Notes
! Images
|-
|
Acritosia ogamensis
|
Sp. nov
|
Valid
|
Tazawa et al.
|
Early Permian (Kungurian)
|
Nabeyama Formation
|

|
|
|-
|
Acrosaccus scutatus
|
Sp. nov
|
Valid
|
Percival in Percival et al.
|
Ordovician
|
|

|
A member of Discinidae.
|
|-
|
Anathyris (Anathyris) calestiennensis
|
Sp. nov
|
Valid
|
Mottequin et al.
|
Devonian (Frasnian)
|
Nismes Formation
|

|
|
|-
|
Anisopleurella antiqua
|
Sp. nov
|
Valid
|
Popov, Kebriaee-Zadeh & Pour
|
Ordovician (Darriwilian)
|
Lashkarak Formation
|

|
A member of Strophomenida belonging to the family Sowerbyellidae.
|
|-
|
Apatobolus anoskelidion
|
Sp. nov
|
Valid
|
Percival in Percival et al.
|
Ordovician
|
|

|
A member of Obolidae.
|
|-
|
Atansoria australis
|
Sp. nov
|
Valid
|
Percival in Percival et al.
|
Ordovician
|
|

|
A member of Obolidae.
|
|-
|
Atryparia (Costatrypa) agricolae
|
Sp. nov
|
Valid
|
Halamski & Baliński in Baliński, Racki & Halamski
|
Devonian (Frasnian)
|
|

|
A member of Atrypidae.
|
|-
|
Aulacothyris maendlii
|
Sp. nov
| 
Valid
|
Sulser
|
Middle Jurassic (Callovian)
|
|

|
A member of Terebratulida belonging to the family Zeilleriidae.
|
|-
|
Aulacothyris waikatoensis
|
Sp. nov
|
Valid
|
MacFarlan
|
Jurassic
|
|

|
A member of Terebratulida.
|
|-
|
Bellimurina fluctuosa
|
Sp. nov
|
Valid
|
Popov, Kebriaee-Zadeh & Pour
|
Ordovician (Darriwilian)
|
Lashkarak Formation
|

|
A member of Strophomenida belonging to the family Strophomenidae.
|
|-
|
Biernatia pseudoplana
|
Sp. nov
|
Valid
|
Engelbretsen in Percival et al.
|
Ordovician
|
|

|
A member of Lingulata belonging to the family Biernatiidae.
|
|-
|
Biernatia wrighti
|
Sp. nov
|
Valid
|
Engelbretsen in Percival et al.
|
Ordovician
|
|

|
A member of Lingulata belonging to the family Biernatiidae.
|
|-
|
Biernatium minus
|
Sp. nov
|
Valid
|
Baliński in Baliński, Racki & Halamski
|
Devonian (Frasnian)
|
|

|
A member of Mystrophoridae.
|
|-
|
Buxtonia inexpletucosta
|
Sp. nov
|
Valid
|
Torres-Martínez & Sour-Tovar
|
Carboniferous (middle Pennsylvanian)
|
Ixtaltepec Formation
|

|
A member of Productoidea.
|
|-
|
Canalilatus musculosus
|
Sp. nov
|
Valid
|
Percival, Engelbretsen & Peng
|
Cambrian
|
Huaqiao Formation
|

|
A lingulate brachiopod belonging to the family Zhanatellidae.
|
|-
|
Centreplicatus
|
Gen. nov
|
Valid
|
Zeng，Zhang & Han in Zeng et al.
|
Ordovician (Hirnantian)
|
|

|
A member of Pentamerida belonging to the family Pentameridae.
|
|-
|
Cerasinella
|
Nom. nov
|
Valid
|
Copper
|
Silurian (Llandovery)
|
Merrimack Formation
|
()
|
An atrypoid brachiopod; a replacement name for Cerasina Copper (1995) (preoccupied).
|
|-
|
Chapinella belkovskensis
|
Sp. nov
|
Valid
|
Baranov, Sokiran & Blodgett
|
Devonian (Famennian)
|
Nerpalakhsk Formation
|
()
|
A member of Rhynchonellida belonging to the family Pugnacidae.
|
|-
|
Chilcatreta
|
Gen. et sp. nov
|
Valid
|
Lavié & Benedetto
|
Ordovician (Darriwilian)
|
San Juan Formation
|

|
A siphonotretid brachiopod. Genus includes new species C. tubulata.
|
|-
|
Crispithyris
|
Gen. et sp. nov
|
Valid
|
MacFarlan
|
Jurassic
|
|

|
A member of Terebratulida. Genus includes new species C. nauarchus.
|
|-
|
Cyrtina transcaucasica
|
Sp. nov
|
Valid
|
Gretchishnikova & Oleneva in Oleneva
|
Devonian (Givetian)
|
|

|
A member of Spiriferinida belonging to the family Cyrtinidae.
|
|-
|
Davidsonia enmerkaris
|
Sp. nov
|
Valid
|
Halamski in Baliński, Racki & Halamski
|
Devonian (Frasnian)
|
|

|
A member of Davidsoniidae.
|
|-
|
Dictyoclostus transversum
|
Sp. nov
|
Valid
|
Torres-Martínez & Sour-Tovar
|
Carboniferous (middle Pennsylvanian)
|
Ixtaltepec Formation
|

|
A member of Productoidea.
|
|-
|
Disculina mancenidoi
|
Sp. nov
|
Valid
|
MacFarlan
|
Jurassic
|
|

|
A member of Terebratulida.
|
|-
|
Dolerorthis nadruvensis
|
Sp. nov
|
Valid
|
Paškevičius & Hints
|
Ordovician (Katian)
|
|

|
A member of Orthida belonging to the family Hesperorthidae.
|
|-
|
Dulankarella hyrcanica
|
Sp. nov
|
Valid
|
Popov, Kebriaee-Zadeh & Pour
|
Ordovician (Darriwilian)
|
Lashkarak Formation
|

|
A member of Strophomenida belonging to the family Leptellinidae.
|
|-
|
Dyoros (Lissosia) maya
|
Sp. nov
|
Valid
|
Torres-Martínez, Sour-Tovar & Barragán
|
Permian (Leonardian)
|
Paso Hondo Formation
|

|
|
|-
|
Echinocoelia parva
|
Sp. nov
|
Valid
|
Baliński in Baliński, Racki & Halamski
|
Devonian (Frasnian)
|
|

|
A member of Ambocoeliidae.
|
|-
|
Eochonetes maearum
|
Sp. nov
|
Valid
|
Bauer & Stigall
|
Late Ordovician
|
|
()
|
|
|-
|
Eochonetes minerva
|
Sp. nov
|
Valid
|
Bauer & Stigall
|
Late Ordovician
|
|
()
|
|
|-
|
Eochonetes voldemortus
|
Sp. nov
|
Valid
|
Bauer & Stigall
|
Late Ordovician
|
Saturday Mountain Formation
|
()
|
|
|-
|
Eoconulus puteus
|
Sp. nov
|
Valid
|
Engelbretsen in Percival et al.
|
Ordovician
|
|

|
A member of Lingulata belonging to the family Eoconulidae.
|
|-
|
Eolingularia
|
Gen. et comb. nov
|
Valid
|
Bitner & Emig
|
Carboniferous to Triassic
|
|

|
A member of Lingulata belonging to the group Lingulida and the family Lingulidae. The type species is "Lingularia" siberica Biernat & Emig (1993).
|
|-
|
Experilingula larga
|
Sp. nov
|
Valid
|
Percival, Engelbretsen & Peng
|
Cambrian
|
Huaqiao Formation
|

|
A member of Obolidae.
|
|-
|
Flexaria magna
|
Sp. nov
|
Valid
|
Torres-Martínez & Sour-Tovar
|
Carboniferous (middle Pennsylvanian)
|
Ixtaltepec Formation
|

|
A member of Productoidea.
|
|-
|
Globiella kamiyassensis
|
Sp. nov
|
Valid
|
Tazawa
|
Permian (Wordian)
|
|

|
|
|-
|
Glossella cuyanica
|
Sp. nov
|
Valid
|
Lavié & Benedetto
|
Ordovician (Darriwilian)
|
San Juan Formation
|

|
|
|-
|
Gondwanorthis
|
Gen. et comb. nov
|
Valid
|
Benedetto & Muñoz
|
Early Ordovician
|
|

|
A plectorthoid brachiopod. A new genus for "Nanorthis" calderensis Benedetto (2007); genus also includes "Nanorthis" bastamensis Ghobadi Pour, Kebriaee-Zadeh & Popov (2011).
|
|-
|
Gowanella
|
Gen. et sp. nov
|
Valid
|
Hiller
|
Late Cretaceous (probably Maastrichtian)
|
Broken River Formation
|

|
A member of Terebratulida related to Ostreathyris. The type species is G. capralis.
|
|-
|
Grandispirifer qaidamensis
|
Sp. nov
|
Valid
|
Lee, Shi & Chen in Shi et al.
|
Carboniferous (Serpukhovian)
|
Huaitoulata Formation
|

|
A member of Spiriferoidea belonging to the family Spiriferidae.
|
|-
|
Gretchispirifer
|
Gen. et sp. nov
|
Valid
|
Oleneva
|
Devonian (Emsian–Eifelian)
|
Sharur Formation
|

|
A member of Spiriferida belonging to the family Adolfiidae. The type species is G. dagnensis.
|
|-
|
Gundaria
|
Gen. et sp. nov
|
Valid
|
Angiolini et al.
|
Permian
|
|

|
The type species is G. insolita.
|
|-
|
Harperoides
|
Gen. et sp. nov
|
Valid
|
Baranov & Blodgett
|
Devonian (Pragian)
|
Soda Creek Limestone
|
()
|
A member of Strophomenida belonging to the subfamily Mesodouvillininae. The type species is Harperoides alaskensis.
|
|-
|
Hemileurus politus
|
Sp. nov
|
Valid
|
Angiolini et al.
|
Permian
|
|

|
|
|-
|
Holcothyris campbelli
|
Sp. nov
|
Valid
|
MacFarlan
|
Jurassic
|
|

|
A member of Terebratulida.
|
|-
|
Hubeinomena
|
Gen. et sp. nov
|
Disputed
|
Zeng，Chen & Han in Zeng et al.
|
Ordovician (Hirnantian)
|
|

|
A member of Strophomenida belonging to the family Sinomenidae. Genus includes new species H. wangjiawanensis. Rong et al. (2019) considered it to be a junior synonym of Coolinia.
|
|-
|
Hustedia shumardi
|
Sp. nov
|
Valid
|
Torres-Martínez, Sour-Tovar & Barragán
|
Permian (Leonardian)
|
Paso Hondo Formation
|

|
|
|-
|
Inflatia coodzavuii
|
Sp. nov
|
Valid
|
Torres-Martínez & Sour-Tovar
|
Carboniferous (late Mississippian, middle Pennsylvanian)
|
Ixtaltepec Formation
|

|
A member of Productoidea.
|
|-
|
Iridistrophia (Flabellistrophia)
|
Subgen. et comb. sp. nov
|
Valid
|
Jansen
|
Devonian (late Emsian to Eifelian)
|
|

?
|
A member of Chilidiopsidae; a subgenus of Iridistrophia. The type species is "Orthis" hipponyx Schnur (1851); the subgenus also includes new species Iridistrophia (Flabellistrophia) musculosa and possibly also "Orthis" undifera Schnur (1853) and Iridistrophia dendritica Benedetto (1984).
|
|-
|
Ishimia inflata
|
Sp. nov
|
Valid
|
Popov, Kebriaee-Zadeh & Pour
|
Ordovician (Darriwilian)
|
Lashkarak Formation
|

|
A member of Strophomenida belonging to the family Leptellinidae.
|
|-
|
Isogramma nakamurai
|
Sp. nov
|
Valid
|
Tazawa
|
Permian (Wordian)
|
|

|
|
|-
|
Jakutoproductus lenensis
|
Sp. nov
|
Valid
|
Makoshin
|
Early Permian
|
|

|
|
|-
|
Jakutoproductus talchanensis
|
Sp. nov
|
Valid
|
Makoshin
|
Early Permian
|
|

|
|
|-
|
Kjaerina (Kjaerina) gondwanensis
|
Sp. nov
|
Valid
|
Colmenar
|
Ordovician (late Sandbian–Katian)
|
Gabian Formation
Glauzy Formation
Louredo Formation
Portixeddu Formation
|

|
A rafinesquinid strophomenid brachiopod, a species of Kjaerina.
|
|-
|
Kjaerina (Villasina)
|
Subgen. et 3 sp. et comb. nov
|
Valid
|
Colmenar
|
Ordovician (Katian)
|
Cavá Formation
Gabian Formation
Portilla de Luna Limestones
Portixeddu Formation
Porto de Santa Anna Formation
Punta Serpeddi Formation
Rosan Formation
|

|
A rafinesquinid strophomenid brachiopod, a subgenus of Kjaerina. The type species of the subgenus is Kjaerina (Villasina) pedronaensis; the subgenus also contains "Hedstroemina" almadenensis Villas (1995), as well as new species Kjaerina (Villasina) meloui and Kjaerina (Villasina) pyrenaica.
|
|-
|
Koneviella? fuscina
|
Sp. nov
|
Valid
|
Percival, Engelbretsen & Peng
|
Cambrian
|
Huaqiao Formation
|

|
A lingulate brachiopod belonging to the family Zhanatellidae.
|
|-
|
Kutchithyris challinori
|
Sp. nov
|
Valid
|
MacFarlan
|
Jurassic
|
|

|
A member of Terebratulida.
|
|-
|
Kutchithyris waitomoensis
|
Sp. nov
|
Valid
|
MacFarlan
|
Jurassic
|
|

|
A member of Terebratulida.
|
|-
|
Lacunites jaroslavi
|
Sp. nov
|
Valid
|
Mergl & Kraft
|
Early Ordovician
|
Klabava Formation
|

|
A paterinate brachiopod.
|
|-
|
Lampazarorthis
|
Gen. et comb. et sp. nov
|
Valid
|
Benedetto & Muñoz
|
Early Ordovician
|
|

|
A plectorthoid brachiopod. A new genus for "Eoorthis" bifurcata Harrington (1937); genus also includes "Nanorthis" brachymyaria Benedetto in Benedetto & Carrasco (2002), as well as new species Lampazarorthis alata.
|
|-
|
Lepidomena multiplicata
|
Sp. nov
|
Valid
|
Popov, Kebriaee-Zadeh & Pour
|
Ordovician (Darriwilian)
|
Lashkarak Formation
|

|
A member of Strophomenida belonging to the family Leptellinidae.
|
|-
|
Leptathyris gornensis
|
Sp. nov
|
Valid
|
Baliński in Baliński, Racki & Halamski
|
Devonian (Frasnian)
|
|

|
A member of Athyrididae.
|
|-
|
Liaous
|
Gen. et sp. nov
|
Valid
|
He & Chen in He et al.
|
Middle Triassic (early Anisian)
|
Xinyuan Formation
|

|
A relative of Mentzelia and Paramentzelia. The type species is Liaous shaiwensis.
|
|-
|
Loboidothyris awakinoensis
|
Sp. nov
|
Valid
|
MacFarlan
|
Jurassic
|
|

|
A member of Terebratulida.
|
|-
|
Loboidothyris grantmackiei
|
Sp. nov
|
Valid
|
MacFarlan
|
Jurassic
|
|

|
A member of Terebratulida.
|
|-
|
Loboidothyris marokopaensis
|
Sp. nov
|
Valid
|
MacFarlan
|
Jurassic
|
|

|
A member of Terebratulida.
|
|-
|
Lyonia rochacamposi
|
Sp. nov
|
Valid
|
Taboada et al.
|
Early Permian (latest Asselian-earliest Sakmarian)
|
Taciba Formation
|

|
A member of Productida belonging to the family Auriculispinidae, a species of Lyonia.
|
|-
|
Mendozotreta
|
Gen. et comb. nov
|
Valid
|
Holmer et al.
|
Ordovician
|
Antelope Valley Limestone
Lindero Formation
|

()
|
A member of Acrotretida belonging to the family Acrotretidae. The type species is "Conotreta" devota Krause & Rowell (1975).
|
|-
|
Mesoleptostrophia belli
|
Sp. nov
|
Valid
|
Earp
|
Early Devonian
|
Montys Hut Formation
|

|
|
|-
|
Minutella bulgarica
|
Sp. nov
|
Valid
|
Bitner & Motchurova-Dekova
|
Miocene (Badenian)
|
|

|
|
|-
|
Minutomena
|
Gen. et sp. nov
|
Valid
|
Zeng，Zhang & Han in Zeng et al.
|
Ordovician (Hirnantian)
|
|

|
A member of the family Strophomenidae. Genus includes new species M. yichangensis.
|
|-
|
Minutorthis
|
Gen. nov
|
Valid
|
Zeng，Chen & Zhang in Zeng et al.
|
Ordovician (Hirnantian)
|
|

|
A member of Orthida belonging to the family Toxorthidae.
|
|-
|
Monelasmina montisjosephi
|
Sp. nov
|
Valid
|
Baliński in Baliński, Racki & Halamski
|
Devonian (Frasnian)
|
|

|
A member of Draboviidae.
|
|-
|
Nasakia
|
Gen. et sp. nov
|
Valid
|
Streng et al.
|
Cambrian
|
Henson Gletscher Formation
|

|
A member of Rhynchonelliformea belonging to the class Obolellata and the order Naukatida. The type species is Nasakia thulensis.
|
|-
|
Numericoma rowelli
|
Sp. nov
|
Valid
|
Holmer et al.
|
Ordovician (Darriwilian)
|
Antelope Valley Limestone
Ponon Trehue Formation
|

()
|
A member of Lingulata belonging to the family Ephippelasmatidae.
|
|-
|
Nushbiella kleithria
|
Sp. nov
|
Valid
|
Percival in Percival et al.
|
Ordovician
|
|

|
A member of Lingulata belonging to the family Siphonotretidae.
|
|-
|
Obliquorhynchia
|
Gen. et comb. nov
|
Valid
|
Schrøder, Lauridsen & Surlyk
|
Paleocene (Danian)
|
Faxe Formation
Vigny Formation
|

|
A member of Rhynchonellida belonging to the superfamily Pugnacoidea and the family Basiliolidae; a new genus for "Terebratula" flustracea von Buch (1834).
|
|-
|
Orthis dehmollaensis
|
Sp. nov
|
Valid
|
Popov, Kebriaee-Zadeh & Pour
|
Ordovician (Darriwilian)
|
Lashkarak Formation
|

|
A member of Orthida belonging to the family Orthidae.
|
|-
|
Paramirorthis
|
Gen. et sp. nov
|
Disputed
|
Zeng，Wang & Peng in Zeng et al.
|
Ordovician (Hirnantian)
|
|

|
A member of the family Dalmanellidae. Genus includes new species P. minuta. Rong et al. (2019) considered it to be a junior synonym of Mirorthis.
|
|-
|
Paraspirifer (Laurentispirifer)
|
Subgen. et comb. nov
|
Valid
|
Jansen
|
Middle Devonian
|
|

|
A subgenus of Paraspirifer. The type species is Paraspirifer conradi Godefroid & Fagerstrom (1983); the subgenus also includes "Delthyris" acuminata Conrad (1839), "Terebratula" acuminatissima de Castelnau (1843), "Spirifer" bownockeri Stewart (1927), Paraspirifer halli Godefroid & Fagerstrom (1983) and Paraspirifer clarkei Godefroid & Fagerstrom (1983).
|
|-
|
Paraspirifer (Mosellospirifer)
|
Subgen. et comb. nov
|
Valid
|
Jansen
|
Devonian (late Emsian to early Eifelian
|
|

?
?
|
A subgenus of Paraspirifer. The type species is Paraspirifer sandbergeri Solle (1971); the subgenus also includes Spirifer auriculatus Sandberger & Sandberger (1856), Paraspirifer sandbergeri longimargo Solle (1971) (elevated to species rank), Paraspirifer eos Solle (1971) and Paraspirifer sandbergeri nepos Solle (1971). The subgenus might also include Paraspirifer gigantea Su (1976) and Paraspirifer desbiensi Bizzarro & Lespérance (1999).
|
|-
|
Parazhanatella
|
Gen. et sp. nov
|
Valid
|
Percival, Engelbretsen & Peng
|
Cambrian
|
Huaqiao Formation
|

|
A lingulate brachiopod belonging to the family Zhanatellidae. The type species is P. paibia.
|
|-
|
Pedderia
|
Gen. et sp. nov
|
Valid
|
Baranov & Blodgett
|
Devonian (Pragian)
|
Soda Creek Limestone
|
()
|
A member of Rhynchonellida belonging to the family Pygmaellidae. The type species is Pedderia fragosa.
|
|-
|
Phragmorthis shahrudensis
|
Sp. nov
|
Valid
|
Popov, Kebriaee-Zadeh & Pour
|
Ordovician (Darriwilian)
|
Lashkarak Formation
|

|
A member of Orthida belonging to the family Phragmorthidae.
|
|-
|
Prospira pseudostruniana
|
Sp. nov
|
Valid
|
Mottequin & Brice
|
Devonian (late Famennian)
|
Etrœungt Formation
|

|
A member of Spiriferida belonging to the family Spiriferidae.
|
|-
|
Psygmakantha
|
Gen. et sp. nov
|
Valid
|
Percival in Percival et al.
|
Ordovician
|
|

|
A member of Lingulata belonging to the family Ephippelasmatidae. The type species is P. malachiensis'.
|
|-
|Punctospirifer gerankalasus|
Sp. nov
|
Valid
|
Oleneva
|
Carboniferous (Tournaisian)
|
|

|
A member of Spiriferinida belonging to the family Punctospiriferidae.
|
|-
|Qaidamospirifer|
Gen. et sp. nov
|
Valid
|
Chen, Lee & Shi in Shi et al.|
Carboniferous (Serpukhovian)
|
Huaitoulata Formation
|

|
A member of Spiriferoidea belonging to the family Choristitidae. The type species is Q. elongatus.
|
|-
|Rafinesquina (Mesogeina)|
Subgen. et comb. et 2 sp. nov
|
Valid
|
Colmenar
|
Ordovician (Katian)
|
Bohdalec Formation
Fombuena Formation
Gabian Formation
Lower Ktaoua Formation
Porto de Santa Anna Formation
Upper Tiouririne Formation
Zahorany Formation
|

|
A rafinesquinid strophomenid brachiopod, a subgenus of Rafinesquina. The type species of the subgenus is "Leptaena" pseudoloricata Barrande (1848); the subgenus also includes Rafinesquina pomoides Havlíček (1971), as well as new species Rafinesquina (Mesogeina) gabianensis and Rafinesquina (Mesogeina) loredensis.
|
|-
|Rhipidomella magna|
Sp. nov
|
Valid
|
Tazawa
|
Permian (Wordian)
|
|

|
|
|-
|Rogorthis? oriens|
Sp. nov
|
Valid
|
Popov, Kebriaee-Zadeh & Pour
|
Ordovician (Darriwilian)
|
Lashkarak Formation
|

|
A member of Orthida belonging to the family Orthidae.
|
|-
|Sampo suduvensis|
Sp. nov
|
Valid
|
Paškevičius & Hints
|
Late Ordovician
|
|

()
|
A member of Strophomenida belonging to the family Leptestiidae.
|
|-
|Sartenaerirhynchus|
Gen. et comb. nov
|
Valid
|
Jansen
|
Devonian (middle Siegenian to late Emsian)
|
|

|
A member of Rhynchonellida belonging to the superfamily Uncinuloidea. The type species is "Terebratula" antiqua Schnur (1853); genus also includes "Uncinulus" frontecostatus Drevermann (1902)
|
|-
|Scaphelasma quadratum|
Sp. nov
|
Valid
|
Engelbretsen in Percival et al.|
Ordovician
|
|

|
A member of Lingulata belonging to the family Scaphelasmatidae.
|
|-
|Schizocrania equestra|
Sp. nov
|
Valid
|
Mergl & Nolčová
|
Ordovician (Katian)
|
Bohdalec Formation
|

|
A member of Discinoidea belonging to the family Trematidae.
|
|-
|Septaliphoria felberi|
Sp. nov
| 
Valid
|
Sulser
|
Middle Jurassic (Callovian)
|
|

|
A member of Rhynchonellida belonging to the superfamily Hemithiridoidea and the family Cyclothyrididae.
|
|-
|Siberioproductus|
Gen. et sp. nov
|
Valid
|
Baranov, Sokiran & Blodgett
|
Devonian (Famennian)
|
Chekursk Formation
|
()
|
A member of Rhynchonelliformea belonging to the group Productida and the family Productellidae. The type species is S. boreus.
|
|-
|Sinomena|
Gen. et sp. nov
|
Disputed
|
Zeng，Chen & Han in Zeng et al.|
Ordovician (Hirnantian)
|
|

|
A member of Strophomenida belonging to the family Sinomenidae. Genus includes new species S. typica. Rong et al. (2019) considered it to be a junior synonym of Eostropheodonta.
|
|-
|Skenidioides cretus|
Sp. nov
|
Valid
|
Halamski in Baliński, Racki & Halamski
|
Devonian (Frasnian)
|
|

|
A member of Skenidiidae.
|
|-
|Spinobolus|
Gen. et sp. nov
|
Valid
|
Zhang et al.|
Cambrian
|
Shuijingtuo Formation
|

|
A linguloid brachiopod. The type species is Spinobolus popovi.
|
|-
|Tapongaspirifer|
Gen. et sp. nov
|
Valid
|
Earp
|
Early Devonian
|
Montys Hut Formation
|

|
A member of Spiriferida belonging to the family Filispiriferidae. The type species is Tapongaspirifer melodiae.
|
|-
|Tasmanospirifer|
Gen. et sp. et comb. nov
|
Valid
|
Waterhouse
|
Permian
|
|

|
A member of Spiriferida. Genus includes new species T. clarkei, as well as "Spirifer" tasmaniensis Morris (1845).
|
|-
|Taungurungetes|
Gen. et comb. nov
|
Valid
|
Earp
|
Early Devonian
|
Montys Hut Formation
Norton Gully Sandstone
|

|
A possible member of Devonochonetinae. The type species is "Chonetes" taggertyensis Gill (1945) from the Montys Hut Formation; genus also contains second, unnamed species from the Norton Gully Sandstone.
|
|-
|Terebratulina leeae|
Sp. nov
|
Valid
|
MacFarlan
|
Jurassic
|
|

|
A member of Terebratulida.
|
|-
|Terebratulina putiensis|
Sp. nov
|
Valid
|
MacFarlan
|
Jurassic
|
|

|
A member of Terebratulida.
|
|-
|Thaerodonta notabile|
Sp. nov
|
Valid
|
Paškevičius
|
Ordovician (Katian)
|
Kaimynai Formation
|

|
|
|-
|Thulatrypa|
Gen. et sp. et comb. nov
|
Valid
|
Huang et al.|
Silurian
|
|

|
An atrypoid brachiopod. The type species is Thulatrypa gregaria; genus also contains "Meifodia" orientalis Rong, Xu & Yang (1974).
|
|-
|Tomteluva|
Gen. et sp. nov
|
Valid
|
Streng et al.|
Cambrian
|
Stephen Formation
|
()
|
A member of Rhynchonelliformea belonging to the class Obolellata and the order Naukatida. The type species is Tomteluva perturbata.
|
|-
|Trentingula|
Gen. et 3 sp. et comb. nov
|
Valid
|
Posenato
|
Late Permian and Early Triassic
|
|

()
|
A member of Linguloidea belonging to the family Lingulidae. The type species is T. lorigae; genus also includes new species T. mazzinensis and T. prinothi, as well as Trentingula borealis (Bittner, 1899).
|
|-
|Triangulospirifer|
Nom. nov
|
Valid
|
Lee in Shi et al.|
Carboniferous
|
|

|
A member of Spiriferida. A replacement name for Triangularia Poletaev (2001).
|
|-
|Trimena|
Gen. nov
|
Valid
|
Zeng，Wang & Peng in Zeng et al.|
Ordovician (Hirnantian)
|
|

|
A member of Plectambonitoidea belonging to the family Xenambonitidae.
|
|-
|Weberproductus|
Gen. et sp. nov
|
Valid
|
Torres-Martínez & Sour-Tovar
|
Carboniferous (middle Pennsylvanian)
|
Ixtaltepec Formation
|

|
A member of Productoidea. Genus includes new species W. donajiae.
|
|-
|Wenjukovispirifer|
Gen. et comb. nov
|
Valid
|
Oleneva
|
Devonian (Famennian)
|
|

|
A member of Spiriferida belonging to the family Cyrtospiriferidae. The type species is "Spirifer" koscharicus Ljaschenko (1959); genus also includes "Spirifer" archiaci Murchison (1840), "Spirifer" brodi Wenjukov (1886) and W. lebedjanicus (Nalivkin, 1947).
|
|-
|Yichangomena|
Gen. et sp. nov
|
Disputed
|
Zeng，Zhang & Han in Zeng et al.|
Ordovician (Hirnantian)
|
|

|
A member of Strophomenida belonging to the family Sinomenidae. Genus includes new species Y. dingjiapoensis. Rong et al. (2019) considered it to be a junior synonym of Eostropheodonta.
|
|-
|Zeilleria opuatiaensis|
Sp. nov
|
Valid
|
MacFarlan
|
Jurassic
|
|

|
A member of Terebratulida.
|
|-
|Zeilleria waiohipaensis|
Sp. nov
|
Valid
|
MacFarlan
|
Jurassic
|
|

|
A member of Terebratulida.
|
|-
|}

Molluscs

Echinoderms

Conodonts

Fishes

Amphibians

Research
 A study on the histology and growth histories of the humeri of the specimens of Acanthostega recovered from the mass-death deposit of Stensiö Bjerg (Greenland) is published by Sanchez et al. (2016), who argue that even the largest individuals from this deposit are juveniles.
 Fossils of a tetrapod resembling Ichthyostega and a probable whatcheeriid-grade tetrapod are described from two Devonian (Famennian) localities from Belgium by Olive et al. (2016).
 A study on the functional significance of the interpterygoid vacuities (holes in the palate) in temnospondyls is published by Lautenschlager, Witzmann & Werneburg (2016).
 A study on the stress distribution in the skulls of Edingerella madagascariensis and Stanocephalosaurus birdi during the bite, with implications for establishing the ecological niches occupied by these temnospondyls, is published by Fortuny et al. (2016).
 A study on the anatomy, ecological niche and life history of members the population of Eocyclotosaurus appetolatus known from the Tecolotito bonebed (Moenkopi Formation; New Mexico, United States) is published by Rinehart & Lucas (2016).
 A study on the morphology of the skull and braincase of Brachydectes newberryi is published by Pardo & Anderson (2016).
 A study on the locomotor capabilities of Triadobatrachus massinoti is published by Lires, Soto & Gómez (2016).
 A revised description of the holotype of Triadobatrachus massinoti based on X-ray micro-tomography data is published by Ascarrunz et al. (2016).
 The first unambiguous frog fossil from the Jurassic of Asia (an atlantal centrum of a possible member of the genus Eodiscoglossus) is described from the Middle Jurassic (Bathonian) Itat Formation (Russia) by Skutschas, Martin & Krasnolutskii (2016).

New taxa

Temnospondyls

Lissamphibians

Others

Lepidosaurs

Lizards

Research
 Twelve specimens of lizards (including stem-gekkotans, crown-agamids, a lacertid, a putative stem-chamaeleonid and squamates of uncertain phylogenetic placement, probably stem-squamates) are described from the Cretaceous (Albian-Cenomanian boundary) amber from Myanmar by Daza et al. (2016); however, the supposed stem-chamaeleonid is subsequently reinterpreted as an albanerpetontid amphibian by Matsumoto & Evans (2018).
 A study of almost 30 specimens of Polyglyphanodon sternbergi, including almost complete skeletons, is published by Simões et al. (2016), who report the discovery of previously unrecognized ontogenetic series, sexual dimorphism and a complete lower temporal bar in the skull of members of this species.
 New anatomical data on the Late Cretaceous lizard Slavoia darevskii is published by Tałanda (2016), who interprets it as a stem-amphisbaenian.
 A study on the skull anatomy of the Eocene amphisbaenian Spathorhynchus fossorium is published by Müller, Hipsley & Maisano (2016).
 A study on mosasaur tooth implantation and its phylogenetic implications is published by Liu et al. (2016).
 A redescription of the mosasaur Hainosaurus bernardi Dollo (1885) is published by Jimenez-Huidobro & Caldwell (2016), who transfer this species to the genus Tylosaurus and synonymize genera Tylosaurus and Hainosaurus.
 A revision of the species assigned to the mosasaur genus Tylosaurus is published by Jiménez-Huidobro, Simões & Caldwell (2016); their conclusion that T. kansasensis is a junior synonym of T. nepaeolicus is subsequently rejected by Stewart & Mallon (2018).
 Early Miocene chamaeleonid fossils, including a specimen tentatively attributed to the species Chamaeleo cf. andrusovi Čerňanský (2010), previously known only from the early Miocene of the Czech Republic, are described from the Aliveri locality (Euboea, Greece) by Georgalis, Villa & Delfino (2016).
 Lizard fossils which might be the oldest known chameleon fossils from India are described from the Miocene Nagri Formation by Sankhyan & Čerňanský (2016).

New taxa

Snakes

Research
 Lee et al. (2016) examine the limb anatomy of Tetrapodophis amplectus, which according to the authors is suggestive of aquatic habits.
 A redescription of the Cenomanian snake Simoliophis rochebrunei on the basis of new fossil material from France is published by Rage, Vullo & Néraudeau (2016).
 Smith & Scanferla (2016) describe a juvenile specimen of Palaeopython fischeri from the Eocene Messel pit with preserved stomach contents, including a specimen of the stem-basilisk species Geiseltaliellus maarius, which in turn preserves an unidentified insect in its stomach.
 McNamara et al. (2016) describe pigment cells responsible for coloration and patterning preserved in a fossil skin of a colubrid snake from the Late Miocene Libros Lagerstätte (Teruel, Spain).
 New fossil material of the viperid Laophis crotaloides is described from Greece by Georgalis et al. (2016).

New taxa

Ichthyosauromorphs

Research
 A study of taxonomic richness, disparity and evolutionary rates of ichthyosaurs throughout the Cretaceous period is published by Fischer et al. (2016).
 A restudy of "Platypterygius" campylodon is published by Fischer (2016), who transfers this species to the genus Pervushovisaurus.
 A revision of the ichthyosaur material of the British Middle and Late Jurassic referable to Ophthalmosaurus icenicus is published by Moon & Kirton (2016).

New taxa

Sauropterygians

Research
 A study of the histology and microanatomy of the humeri of members of the genus Nothosaurus is published by Klein et al. (2016).
 A reassessment of fossils attributed to the genus Polyptychodon is published by Madzia (2016), who considers the type species of this genus, P. interruptus, to be nomen dubium, and the genus Polyptychodon to be a wastebasket taxon.
 O'Gorman (2016) provides a new diagnosis for Fresnosaurus drescheri and describes additional plesiosaur material from the Late Cretaceous (Maastrichtian) Moreno Formation (California, USA), which he interprets as representing the first aristonectine plesiosaur reported from the Northern Hemisphere.
 A redescription of the holotype specimen of Brancasaurus brancai and a study on the phylogenetic relationships of the species is published by Sachs, Hornung & Kear (2016), who consider the species Gronausaurus wegneri to be a junior synonym of B. brancai.

New taxa

Turtles

Research
 A study on the latitudinal gradients in species diversity of Mesozoic non-marine turtles is published by Nicholson et al. (2016).
 A study on the morphological diversity of the skulls of the fossil and recent turtles through time is published by Foth & Joyce (2016).
 A study of the bone shell histology of Condorchelys antiqua and its implications for the lifestyle of the species is published by Cerda, Sterli & Scheyer (2016).
 A study of the bone histology of shell elements of the Late Cretaceous—Paleocene chelid Yaminuechelys is published by Jannello, Cerda & de la Fuente (2016).
 A review of the fossil record, taxonomy and diagnostic features of the fossil species belonging to the genus Chelus is published by Ferreira et al. (2016).
 Fossils of Plesiochelys etalloni and Tropidemys langii, otherwise known from the Kimmeridgian of the Swiss and French Jura Mountains, are described from the British Kimmeridge Clay by Anquetin & Chapman (2016).
 An emended diagnosis of Testudo catalaunica and a study of phylogeny of extinct members of the genus Testudo is published by Luján et al. (2016).
 Giant tortoise fossils collected from the late Miocene-early Pliocene Mehrten Formation (California, USA) are identified as belonging to members of the species Hesperotestudo orthopygia by Biewer et al. (2016).

New taxa

Archosauriformes

Other reptiles

Research
 A skull of a juvenile specimen of Delorhynchus cifellii is described from the Richards Spur locality (Oklahoma, United States) by Haridy et al. (2016).
 A revision of the systematics of the Chinese pareiasaurs is published by Benton (2016).
 A study of evolution of body size of the carnivorous and herbivorous members of Captorhinidae is published by Brocklehurst (2016).
 Surmik et al. (2016) describe nothosaurid and tanystropheid bones from the Triassic of Poland preserving blood-vessel-like structures enclosing organic molecules.
 Two new specimens of Atopodentatus unicus are described by Chun et al. (2016), providing new information on the skull anatomy of this species and indicating that its rostrum, rather than being downturned as originally assumed, developed a hammerhead-like shape.
 Description of new material of Hemilopas mentzeli from the Middle Triassic of Silesia (Poland) and a study of the phylogenetic relationships of the species is published by Surmik (2016).
 Description of the anatomy of partially articulated forelimbs and isolated forelimb bones of Drepanosaurus recovered from the Late Triassic (Norian) Hayden Quarry (Chinle Formation) of New Mexico, USA is published by Pritchard et al. (2016).
 A study on the femoral and tibial histology of the rhynchosaur Stenaulorhynchus stockleyi is published by Werning & Nesbitt (2016).
 A study on the maximum body size and distribution of the reptile species known to have gone extinct during the last 50,000 years, as well as the role played by these factors in recent reptile extinction events, is published by Slavenko et al. (2016).

New taxa

Synapsids

Non-mammalian synapsids

Research
 A study on the respiratory system and paleobiology of caseids is published by Lambertz et al. (2016), who argue that at least some caseids might have been predominantly aquatic and that a homologue of the mammalian diaphragm might have been present in caseids.
 A redescription of the sphenacodontian taxa Palaeohatteria and Pantelosaurus is published by Spindler (2016), who assigns both these taxa to the clade Palaeohatteriidae, but considers it likely that they represent distinct valid taxa.
 A study on the paleoneurology of non-mammaliaform therapsids is published by Benoit, Manger & Rubidge (2016), who argue that whiskers, body hair coverage and mammary glands might have been present in some non-mammaliaform therapsids.
 A study on the occurrence and size of the parietal foramen (an opening in which the pineal eye is located) in non-mammaliaform therapsids (especially non-mammaliaform eutheriodonts) known from the Karoo Supergroup of South Africa is published by Benoit et al. (2016).
 A study of life histories and growth patterns as indicated by bone tissue microstructure and body size in members of three synapsid groups that survived Permian–Triassic extinction event (dicynodonts, therocephalians and cynodonts) and one that didn't (gorgonopsians) is published by Botha-Brink et al. (2016).
 A revision of the systematics of the gorgonopsian subfamily Rubidgeinae is published by Kammerer (2016).
 A study on the anatomy and potential function of the cranial outgrowths of Choerosaurus dejageri is published by Benoit et al. (2016).
 Benoit & Jasinoski (2016) present a digital reconstruction of the lost holotype specimen of the cynodont species Scalopocynodon gracilis (a junior synonym of Procynosuchus delaharpeae).
 A study on the microstructure of the postcanine teeth of the trirachodontid cynodont Cricodon metabolus is published by Hendrickx, Abdala & Choiniere (2016).
 A description of a new specimen of Massetognathus ochagaviae collected at the Middle Triassic Dinodontosaurus Assemblage Zone (Brazil) is published by Pavanatto et al. (2016).
 A study comparing the growth patterns of the tritylodontid cynodont Oligokyphus and the basal mammaliaform Morganucodon is published by O'Meara & Asher (2016).
 Hair-like structures found in a coprolite recovered from the Late Permian Vyazniki site (Russia), which might represent the oldest evidence of hair in the stem group of mammals, are described by Bajdek et al. (2016).

New taxa

Mammals

Other animals

Research
 Traces of a wriggling, mucus-secreting animal are described from the Ediacaran Doushantuo Formation (China) by Wang et al. (2016), who name a new ichnotaxon Linbotulitaenia globulus.
 New fossils of Ernietta plateauensis are described from the Ediacaran site in southern Namibia by Elliott et al. (2016).
 Embryo-like fossils are described from the Ediacaran Doushantuo Formation (China) by Yin et al. (2016), who argue that at least some of these fossils represent crown-animal embryos.
 New fossil material of Oesia disjuncta is described by Nanglu et al. (2016), who interpret this species as a primitive acorn worm that inhabited the tubes previously identified as the alga Margaretia.
 A redescription of Helenodora inopinata and a study of its phylogenetic relationships is published by Murdock, Gabbott & Purnell (2016).
 Description of the anatomy of the fossil velvet worm Cretoperipatus burmiticus and a study on its phylogenetic relationships is published by de Sena Oliveira et al. (2016).
 A study on the anatomy of the mouth apparatus of the lobopodian Pambdelurion whittingtoni is published by Vinther et al. (2016), who show that its mouth apparatus was identical to the fossilized feeding apparatus described under the name Omnidens.

New taxa

Other organisms
New taxa

Research
 Probable stromatolites are described from the 3,700-Myr-old rocks from the Isua supracrustal belt (Greenland) by Nutman et al. (2016); however, Allwood et al. (2018) subsequently argue that these putative stromatolites as more likely to be structures of non-biological origin.
 Exceptionally large, organic, smooth-walled, coccoidal microfossils are described from the 2.52 Ga Gamohaan Formation (South Africa) by Czaja, Beukes & Osterhout (2016), who interpret them as fossils of sulfur-oxidizing bacteria similar to members of the modern genus Thiomargarita.
 Macroscopic fossils up to 30 cm long and nearly 8 cm wide are described from the 1,56-billion-year-old Gaoyuzhuang Formation (Yanshan area, North China) by Zhu et al. (2016), who interpret them as probable fossils of benthic multicellular eukaryotes of size that is unprecedentedly large for eukaryotes older than the Ediacaran Period.
 Organic-walled microfossils (at least some of which are eukaryote fossils) with holes in the walls similar to those formed by predatory protists in the walls of their prey to consume the contents inside are described from the 780–740 million-year-old Chuar Group (Grand Canyon, Arizona, USA) by Porter (2016).
 Tubular microfossils showing similarities to modern coenocytic green and yellow-green algae are described from the ~2.8 to 2.7 Ga lacustrine deposits in South Africa by Kaźmierczak et al. (2016).
 Soft-bodied discoidal specimens resembling Aspidella are described from the Ediacaran Cerro Negro Formation (Argentina) by Arrouy et al.'' (2016).

References

 
2010s in paleontology
P